
Gmina Grębków is a rural gmina (administrative district) in Węgrów County, Masovian Voivodeship, in east-central Poland. Its seat is the village of Grębków, which lies approximately 16 kilometres (10 mi) south-west of Węgrów and 61 km (38 mi) east of Warsaw.

Villages
Gmina Grębków contains the villages and settlements of Aleksandrówka, Chojeczno-Cesarze, Chojeczno-Sybilaki, Gałki, Grębków, Grodzisk, Jabłonna, Kolonia Sinołęka, Kopcie, Kózki, Leśnogóra, Nowa Sucha, Nowa Trzcianka, Ogródek, Oszczerze, Pobratymy, Podsusze, Polków-Daćbogi, Polków-Sagały, Proszew A, Proszew B, Słuchocin, Stara Sucha, Stara Trzcianka, Stawiska, Suchodół, Trzebucza, Żarnówka and Ziomaki.

Neighbouring gminas
Gmina Grębków is bordered by the gminas of Kałuszyn, Kotuń, Liw, Mokobody and Wierzbno.

References

Polish official population figures 2006

Grebkow
Węgrów County